The Baltimore Thunder were a member of the National Lacrosse League from 1987 until 1999. They were based in Baltimore, Maryland, and won the first Eagle Pro Box Lacrosse League (later the National Lacrosse League) championship in 1987. After the 1999 season, the franchise moved three times, becoming the Pittsburgh CrosseFire in 2000, the Washington Power in 2001, and finally the Colorado Mammoth in 2003.

Awards and honors

All time record

Playoff results

Championships

References

External links
[1] NLL.com

Defunct National Lacrosse League teams
Lacrosse in Baltimore
Lacrosse clubs established in 1987
Sports clubs disestablished in 1999
Lacrosse teams in Maryland
Major Indoor Lacrosse League teams
1987 establishments in Maryland
1999 disestablishments in Maryland